Nong Mamong, Nong Mamong is a sub-District (tambon) of Nong Mamong District (amphoe) in Chai Nat Province central Thailand.

Tambon of Chai Nat Province